The abbreviation NCMM may stand for

National Center for the Middle Market, Ohio State University, United States
National Commission for Museums and Monuments, Nigeria